The Ice River Spring on Ellesmere Island, in Nunavut, Canada, is a high discharge perennial spring. As of 2014, it is the highest latitude perennial spring known. The spring's discharge has carved a gully, and flows to the Ice River. The spring was originally discovered in 2009, and observed to gush forth all year round. Analysis of the spring water, shows that it originated from the surface, and circulated deep into the Earth before returning through the cryosphere. The spring flows year-round, even in the middle of winter when surface air temperatures reach . The gully it carves out is reminiscent of gullies on Mars.

Further reading

References

External links
 

Ellesmere Island
Springs of Canada
Landforms of Qikiqtaaluk Region
Landforms of Nunavut